Lamar Johnson may refer to:

 Lamar Johnson (baseball), born 1950
 Lamar Johnson (footballer), born 1991
 Lamar Johnson (actor), born 1994

See also
 Lamar Johnstone